Saint Kitts and Nevis competed at the 2019 Pan American Games in Lima, Peru from July 26 to August 11, 2019.

A total of four athletes (two per gender, and all in track and field) were named to the team in July 2019. The chef de mission of the team was Lester Hanley. During the opening ceremony of the games, high jumper Jermaine Francis carried the flag of the country as part of the parade of nations.

Preparation
The St. Kitts and Nevis Olympic Committee financially assisted ten track and field athletes and two table tennis athletes in their quest for attaining qualification standards for the games. The country attempted to qualify in multiple sports, but the team size was smaller compared to four years prior in Toronto, Canada.

Competitors
The following is the list of number of competitors (per gender) participating at the games per sport/discipline.

Athletics (track and field)

All four of Saint Kitts and Nevis' athletes competed in track and field.

Key
Note–Ranks given for track events are for the entire round
q = Qualified for the next round as a fastest loser 
SB = Seasonal best

Track events

Field event

References

Nations at the 2019 Pan American Games
2019
2019 in Saint Kitts and Nevis